Stately Victor (foaled May 1, 2007 in Kentucky) is an American Thoroughbred racehorse. He ran in the 2010 Kentucky Derby, coming in eighth. Bred by Frank Stronach's Adena Springs, he is a son of Ghostzapper, the 2004 American Horse of the Year and ranked number one in the world that year. He is out of the mare Collect The Cash, a daughter of Dynaformer, the sire of Barbaro.

Owned by Thomas F. and Jack Conway (The latter is a former Attorney General of Kentucky and once a Kentucky Democratic Party candidate for the United States Senate), Stately Victor won the Grade 1 Blue Grass Stakes at Keeneland on April 10, 2010, prior to running in the Kentucky Derby.

References
 Stately Victor's pedigree and partial racing stats

External links
 Video of Stately Victor winning the 2010 Blue Grass Stakes

2007 racehorse births
Thoroughbred family 10-a
Racehorses bred in Kentucky
Racehorses trained in the United States